The Ven. Desmond Carnelley (November 1929 - 23 December 2020) was the Archdeacon of Doncaster from 1985 to 1994.

Carnelley was educated at  St John's College, York and Ripon Hall Oxford; and ordained deacon in 1960 and priest in 1961.

After a curacy in Aston (1960–63), he was Priest in charge at St Paul, Ecclesfield (1963–67). He was Vicar of Balby from 1967 to 1973; and then of Mosborough from 1973 to 1985 (and Rural Dean of Attercliffe from 1979 to 1984). For part of the period whilst being Archdeacon of Doncaster, he was Director of Education for the Diocese of Sheffield (1991–94).

He died in 2020, aged 91.

References

People associated with York St John University
Alumni of Ripon College Cuddesdon
Archdeacons of Doncaster
1929 births
2020 deaths